In organic chemistry, acetophenide is a functional group which is composed of the cyclic ketal of a diol with acetophenone. In pharmaceutical chemistry, it is present in algestone acetophenide (dihydroxyprogesterone acetophenide) and amcinafide (triamcinolone acetophenide).

See also
 Acetonide
 Acroleinide
 Aminobenzal
 Cyclopentanonide
 Pentanonide

References